Mauro-Giuseppe Lepori, O.Cist., born 1959 is since 2010 the current General Abbot of the Cistercian order.

He entered in 1984 Hauterive Abbey, became priest in 1990. He was between 1990 and 1994 novice master in this abbey. He was elected and ordained in 1994 as Abbot of Hauterive and in 2010 as 82nd abbot-general in succession of Maurus Esteva Alsina OCist. He was succeeded in the abbey by Marc de Pothuau.

Works 
 L'amato presente. L'esperienza della misericordia. – Genova-Milano : Marietti, 2002
 Simone chiamato Pietro. Sui passi di un uomo alla sequela di Dio. – Genova-Milano : Marietti, 2004
 Il mistero è pasquale. Omelie per il Triduo Sacro 1995–2004. – Genova-Milano : Marietti, 2006
 Fu invitato anche Gesù. Conversazoini sulla vocazione famigliare. – Siena : Cantagalli, 2006
 Sorpresi dalla gratuità. – Siena : Cantagalli, 2007
 La vita si è manifestata. Omelie sull'attesa, l'avvenimento e la manifestazione dell'Incarnazione del Signore. – Genova-Milano : Marietti, 2008
 Simon Petrus: Gedanken aus dem Zisterzienserkloster. – Freiburg : Paulus, 2008
 Simon Called Peter. In the Company of a Man in Search of God. – San Francisco : Ignatius, 2010. –

References

Cistercian abbots general
Living people
1959 births